The Rolling River is a short river of the Tasman Region of New Zealand's South Island. It is formed by the confluence of several streams - Nuggety Creek, Blue Creek, and Granity Creek - and flows north to reach the Wangapeka River 12 kilometres north of Mount Owen.

See also
List of rivers of New Zealand

References

Rivers of the Tasman District
Rivers of New Zealand